Ireby and Uldale is a civil parish in the Borough of Allerdale in Cumbria, England.  It contains 35 listed buildings that are recorded in the National Heritage List for England.  Of these, one is listed at Grade I, the highest of the three grades, two are at Grade II*, the middle grade, and the others are at Grade II, the lowest grade.  The parish is mainly rural, and contains the villages and smaller settlements of Ireby, High Ireby, Uldale, and Ruthwaite.  Most of the listed buildings are houses, cottages, farmhouses, farm buildings, and associated structures.  The other listed buildings include churches and associated structures, a market cross, a war memorial, and a hotel.


Key

Buildings

References

Citations

Sources

Lists of listed buildings in Cumbria